Amistad is an unincorporated community in Union County, New Mexico, United States. It is located approximately 39 miles south of Clayton on State Route 402.

History
Amistad was a stop for cattle drives during the late 19th century. In 1906, Henry S. Wannamaker, a Congregational minister, promoted homesteading by placing ads in church newspapers. This led to more than 40 older ministers staking claims in Amistad. They formed "The Improvement Association" and named the community Amistad, after the Spanish word for friendship. A post office was established in 1907. At one time there were two newspapers in Amistad. The population declined in later years, but Amistad is still inhabited.

See also

 Amistad Gymnasium
 Category:Unincorporated communities in New Mexico

References

External links

Unincorporated communities in Union County, New Mexico
Unincorporated communities in New Mexico